Rudi Victor Ball  (June 22, 1911 – September 19, 1975) was a Germany ice hockey player. He is a member of the IIHF Hall of Fame.

Early and personal life
Ball was born in Berlin, Germany and died in Johannesburg, South Africa.

Jewish heritage
Ball was Jewish, and was one of two Jewish athletes to represent Germany in the 1936 Winter Olympic Games, along with Helene Mayer, and represented Germany at the Summer Games that year. There was much controversy about his inclusion in the 1936 German Olympic Ice Hockey team at the time by the Nazi government. Ball was inducted into the International Ice Hockey Hall of Fame in 2004.

Career
During his playing career, spanning from 1928 to 1952, he won the German Championship 8 times (1928–1944) and participated for Germany in the 1932 and 1936 Olympic Winter Games and in four World Championships 1930–1938.

He played in total 49 official games for Germany, between 1929 and 1938, and scored 19 goals. Ball was voted as the best European ice hockey player in a French Sports Magazine in 1930. He was considered one of the most popular and dreaded European ice hockey players prior to the Second World War. Ball scored over 500 goals during his career.

He and his two brothers, Gerhard Ball and Heinz Ball, represented Germany in many international competitions in their hockey careers. While reasonably short, Ball was considered extremely fast on the ice and was admired as having much skill and ability.

Ball was included in the 1932 German ice hockey team, to play at the 1932 Olympic games, held in Lake Placid. The German team won the bronze medal. He played all six matches and scored three goals.

1936 German Olympics
In 1936, because he was Jewish, Ball (the 25-year-old captain) was initially overlooked for selection in the German ice hockey team.  His good friend and teammate, Gustav Jaenecke, refused to play unless Ball was included. Ball also believed a deal could be struck to save his family in Germany if he returned to play in the games. The German selectors also realized that without Ball and Jaenecke the team would not stand a chance of winning.  Another factor was that the Nazi party could not overlook the fact that Ball was without doubt one of the leading athletes in his sport. With much controversy Ball was included in the German team to play at the 1936 Olympic games.   One report of the time proposed that Ball was playing against his will. The deal for Ball's family to leave Germany was also agreed. After Ball was injured, the Germans took 5th place in the Olympic tournament. Ball played four matches and scored two goals.

Ball followed his brother, Heinz, to South Africa in 1948. He died in Johannesburg in 1975.

Ball was inducted into the IIHF Hall of Fame in 2004.

Teams
International Level
Germany – 1932 & 1936 Olympics
Germany – World Championships (1930, 1932 & 1938)

Club Level

Berliner SC (1928–33)
EHC St. Moritz  (1933–34)
Diavoli Rossi Neri (1934–36)
Berliner SC (1936–44)
SG Eichkamp Berlin (1946–48)
Tigers IHC (1949–50)
Wolves IHC (1950–51)
 

Awards

Olympic Bronze (1932)
World Championship Silver (1930)
European Championship Gold (1930)
World Championship Bronze (1932)
European Championship Bronze (1936 & 1938)
8 German Championships (1928–1944)
Spengler Cup (1928–29, 1934–35 & 1935–36)
South African Championship (1951)
IIHF Hall of Fame (2004)

See also
List of select Jewish ice hockey players

References

External links
Rudi Ball Biography
IIHF Hall of Fame Entry

1911 births
1975 deaths
Berliner SC players
German ice hockey right wingers
Jewish emigrants from Nazi Germany to South Africa
Ice hockey people from Berlin
Ice hockey players at the 1932 Winter Olympics
Ice hockey players at the 1936 Winter Olympics
IIHF Hall of Fame inductees
Jewish ice hockey players
Medalists at the 1932 Winter Olympics
Olympic bronze medalists for Germany
Olympic ice hockey players of Germany
Olympic medalists in ice hockey
South African people of German-Jewish descent
South African Jews